Grande Fratello 15 is the fifteenth season of the Italian version of the reality show franchise Big Brother. The season premiered on 17 April 2018 and concluded on 4 June 2018. It is the shortest season of the Grande Fratello series, lasting only 49 days.

Barbara D'Urso returned as the main host of the show. Alberto Mezzetti emerged as the winner of the season.

Housemates

Nominations table

Notes
 : The only eligible housemates to be nominated were Filippo, Simone P. and Valerio. The housemate with most votes would be immediately evicted and the other two housemates would remain nominated.
 : The female votes counted double.
 : Aída as a new housemate, was exempt from nominations.
 : In this round of nominations, the male housemates nominated male housemates and the female housemates nominated female housemates.
 : Aída and Luigi were nominated by Grande Fratello because of their aggressive behaviour.

TV Ratings

External links 
 Official site 

15